The House is a 1997 French-Lithuanian drama film directed by Šarūnas Bartas. It was screened in the Un Certain Regard section at the 1997 Cannes Film Festival.

Cast
 Valeria Bruni Tedeschi
 Leos Carax
 Micaela Cardoso
 Oksana Chernych
 Alex Descas
 Egle Kuckaite
 Jean-Louis Loca
 Viktorija Nareiko
 
 Eugenia Sulgaite
 Leonardas Zelcius
 Marija Olšauskaitė

References

External links

1997 films
1997 drama films
Lithuanian-language films
1990s French-language films
Films directed by Šarūnas Bartas
Films produced by Paulo Branco
1997 multilingual films
Lithuanian multilingual films
French multilingual films